Pavan may refer to: 
 pavan, English spelling of pavane, a slow 16th-century dance, or the music for such a dance
 Pavan (Hindu god), a god of wind in Hindu mythology and father of Hanuman
 Pavan, Iran, a village in Hamadan Province, Iran
 Pavan, Dahanu, a village in Maharashtra, India
 18123 Pavan, a main belt asteroid

People with the given name
 Pavan Duggal, Indian advocate in cyberlaw and e-commerce law
 Pavan Malhotra, Hindi film and television actor
Pavan Ramdya (born 1979), American neuroscientist and bioengineer

People with the surname
 Andrea Pavan (born 1989), Italian golfer 
 Carla Pavan (born 1975), Canadian skeleton racer
 Crodowaldo Pavan (1919–2009), Brazilian biologist and geneticist
 Marisa Pavan (born 1932), Italian-born actress
 Rebecca Pavan (born 1990), Canadian volleyball player
 Sarah Pavan (born 1986), Canadian beach volleyball player
 Simone Pavan (born 1974), Italian footballer

See also
 Pavane (disambiguation)